The 1974 UEFA European Under-23 Championship, which spanned two years (1972–74) had 21 entrants. Hungary U-23 won the competition.

The 21 national teams were divided into eight groups (five groups of 3 + three group of 2).   The group winners played off against each other on a two-legged home-and-away basis until the winner was decided.  There was no finals tournament or 3rd-place playoff.

Qualifying stage

Draw
The allocation of teams into qualifying groups was based on that of 1974 FIFA World Cup qualification with several changes, reflecting the absence of some nations:
 Group 1 did not include Hungary (moved to Group 7) and Malta, but included Czechoslovakia (moved from Group 8)
 Group 2 did not include Switzerland and Luxembourg
 Group 3 did not include Belgium and Iceland
 Group 4 did not include Finland (moved to Group 8)
 Group 5 did not include England and Wales, but included Denmark (moved from Group 8) and West Germany (who did not participate in World Cup qualification)
 Group 6 did not include Northern Ireland and Cyprus
 Group 7 did not include Spain, but included Hungary (moved from Group 1)
 Group 8 (based on World Cup qualifying Group 9) did not include Republic of Ireland, but included Finland (moved from Group 4)

Knockout stages

See also 
 UEFA European Under-21 Championship

External links 
 Results Archive at uefa.com
 RSSSF Results Archive ''at rsssf.com

UEFA European Under-21 Championship
UEFA
UEFA
1974 in youth association football